Center Branch Wildlife Management Area is located on  in Harrison County near Stonewood, West Virginia.  The WMA is located on a former strip mine site, and contains several flat benches and high walls.  Second growth oak-hickory and mixed hardwoods forests cover much of the land.

Center Branch is located along Turkey Run, a tributary of Elk Creek and the West Fork River.  The main entrance is via Turkey Run Road (County Route 20/11) off West Virginia Route 20 near Stonewood.

Hunting
Hunting opportunities include deer, grouse, squirrel, turkey and grouse. Camping is prohibited at this WMA.

See also
Animal conservation
Hunting
List of West Virginia wildlife management areas

References

External links
 West Virginia DNR District 1 Wildlife Management Areas
West Virginia Hunting Regulations
West Virginia Fishing Regulations

Wildlife management areas of West Virginia
Protected areas of Harrison County, West Virginia
IUCN Category V